Live in Berkeley, CA is a live album by the band King Crimson, recorded at the Greek Theatre, Berkeley, California, United States, on August 13, 1982.  It was released through the King Crimson Collectors' Club in May 2001.

The original pressing was flawed, resulting in playback being too fast and high in pitch.  It was intended to be re-pressed at some point but wasn't for various reasons. It has recently been released by DGMLive.com as a free download to celebrate DGMLive's first anniversary.

Track listing
 "Waiting Man" (Adrian Belew, Bill Bruford Robert Fripp, Tony Levin) – 9:25
 "Thela Hun Ginjeet" (Belew, Bruford, Fripp, Levin) – 7:41
 "Red" (Fripp) – 6:16
 "The Howler" (Belew, Bruford, Fripp, Levin) – 4:58
 "Frame by Frame" (Belew, Bruford, Fripp, Levin) – 4:57
 "Matte Kudasai" (待ってください, Please Wait for Me) (Belew, Bruford, Fripp, Levin) – 3:30
 "The Sheltering Sky" (Belew, Bruford, Fripp, Levin) – 9:10
 "Discipline" (Belew, Bruford, Fripp, Levin) – 5:28
 "Neal and Jack and Me" (Belew, Bruford, Fripp, Levin) – 5:48
 "Neurotica" (Belew, Bruford, Fripp, Levin) – 5:34
 "Elephant Talk" (Belew, Bruford, Fripp, Levin) – 5:22
 "Indiscipline" (Belew, Bruford, Fripp, Levin) – 10:42

Personnel
 Robert Fripp – guitar
 Adrian Belew – guitar, vocals
 Tony Levin – bass guitar, Chapman stick
 Bill Bruford – drums, percussion

References

2001 live albums
King Crimson Collector's Club albums
Culture of Berkeley, California